The 2022 Liga 3 Gorontalo or the official name Gorontalo Governor's Cup Liga 3, is the fifth edition of Liga 3 Gorontalo organized by Asprov PSSI Gorontalo.

Followed by 27 clubs. The winner of this competition will immediately advance to the national round.

Persidago Gorontalo is the defending champion after winning it in the 2021 season.

Teams 
2022 Liga 3 Gorontalo was attended by 26 teams from regencies and cities in Gorontalo who registered with the Asprov PSSI Gorontalo.

Venues
Merdeka Stadium, Gorontalo City
23 January Stadium, Gorontalo Regency
Pemuda Boalemo Stadium, Boalemo Regency
25 February Stadium, Pohuwato Regency

Group stage

Group A

Group B

Group C

Group D

Knockout stage 

Wait for the completion of the group phase first.

References

Liga 3